Edward Douglas White Catholic High School is a private, Roman Catholic junior and senior high school in Thibodaux, Louisiana in the Diocese of Houma-Thibodaux.  It is named for 
Edward Douglass White, ninth Chief Justice of the United States and native of Lafourche Parish.

Athletics
Edward Douglas White Catholic athletics competes in the LHSAA.

Sports offered:
Football
Baseball
Volleyball
Cross Country
Tennis
Track
Soccer
Basketball
Softball
Swimming
Golf
Bowling
Fishing Team

Championships
Football championships
(2) State Championships: 1968, 1969

Football
Football rivals
Vandebilt Catholic High School: As the only two Catholic high schools in the Houma-Thibodaux area, the football rivalry between E.D. White and Vandebilt has a long-running history.  Oftentimes, the students of both schools will support their respective teams fervently, even if they have no interest in the sport.  It is for this reason why E.D. White's rivalry with Vandebilt runs strong to this day.

Thibodaux High School: Thibodaux High and E.D. White share the same town.  The football rivalry is known as "The Battle for Thibodaux."  The first meeting for this battle was in 2007 with the Cardinals winning 30–14.  In 2008, the Tigers claimed victory with a 13–3 score over the Cardinals.  The teams usually compete against each other in the Thibodaux Jamboree to this day.

Campus
Facilities

E.D. White has facilities for academic, athletic, and extracurricular activities. The E.D. White campus is composed of the main building, the Père-Ménard building (which houses the EDW Media Center and the Academic Enhancement Center), the Preston LeJune Gymnasium, the Cardinal baseball field, the Cardinal softball field, the football field, the St. Teresa music hall, the student union, and the Dr. Richard Morvant Gymnasium.

Improvements, renovations, and new projects have been completed to further the quality of education at the school. All English classrooms have had Smart Boards installed and the science laboratories have been updated as well.

Notes and references

Catholic secondary schools in Louisiana
Schools in Lafourche Parish, Louisiana
Educational institutions established in 1965
Private middle schools in Louisiana
Thibodaux, Louisiana
1965 establishments in Louisiana